Novgorodka is the name of several rural localities in Russia:
Novgorodka, Amur Oblast, a selo in Novgorodsky Rural Settlement of Svobodnensky District of Amur Oblast
Novgorodka, Pskov Oblast, a village in Pushkinogorsky District of Pskov Oblast
Novgorodka, Tver Oblast, a village in Spirovsky District of Tver Oblast

Novgorodka is also the name of the coin minted in the Novgorod Republic in 15th century.

See also
Novgorod (disambiguation)